Kim Warwick and Evonne Goolagong were the defending champions but both players chose not to participate.

Jean-Claude Barclay and Françoise Dürr won in the final 6–1, 6–4 against Patrice Dominguez and Betty Stöve.

Seeds

Draw

Finals

Top half

Bottom half

References

External links
1973 French Open – Doubles draws and results at the International Tennis Federation

Mixed Doubles
French Open by year – Mixed doubles